The Fisherville Historic and Archeological District is a historic site in Exeter, Rhode Island.  It is centered on Fisherville Brook in northeastern Exeter, around a mill complex that flourished in the mid-19th century.  It includes the foundational remnants of a gristmill, sawmill, and included an abandoned early-19th century Cape style house at the time of its National Register nomination in 1980.

The site was listed on the National Register of Historic Places in 1980.

See also
National Register of Historic Places listings in Washington County, Rhode Island

References

Exeter, Rhode Island
Historic districts in Washington County, Rhode Island
Historic districts on the National Register of Historic Places in Rhode Island
Archaeological sites on the National Register of Historic Places in Rhode Island